Khalil, Khelil, or Khaleel may refer to:

People
 Khalil (Pashtun tribe)
 Kahlil Gibran (1883–1931), Lebanese-American writer, poet, visual artist, and Lebanese nationalist
 Khalil (scholar), 19th century Islamic scholar in the Emirate of Harar
 DJ Khalil (born 1973), American hip hop and soul music producer
 Khalil (name), a surname or personal name of multiple individuals and families
 Khalil Mack (born 1991), NFL linebacker for the Chicago Bears
 Robert "Bob" Khaleel, American hip hop musician better known as Bronx Style Bob

Places

Algeria
Khelil, Algeria, town and commune in Bordj Bou Arréridj Province, Algeria
Sidi Khellil, town and commune in El M'Ghair District, El Oued Province, Algeria
Aïn Ben Khelil,  a town and commune in district of Mécheria, Naâma Province, Algeria

Iran
 Halil River, also Haliri River or Zar Dasht River in its upper reaches, a river in the Jiroft and Kahnuj districts of Kerman Province, Iran
 Khalil Kord, a village in Iran
 Khalil, alternate name of Qaleh-ye Khalileh, a village in Iran
 Qaleh-ye Khalil, a village in Khuzestan Province, Iran
 Halil Rural District, in Kerman Province, Iran

Palestine
 Al-Khalil, the Arabic name of Hebron

Music
 Khalil (band), R&B band from South Africa
 Khalil (singer) (born 1994), singer from California

See also
 Halil, a given name
 Jalil (disambiguation), including Calil
 Khalili (disambiguation)